Eumorpha triangulum is a moth of the  family Sphingidae.

Distribution 
It is found throughout Latin America; namely Mexico, Belize, Guatemala, Honduras, Nicaragua, Costa Rica, Panama, Colombia, Ecuador, Peru, Bolivia, Argentina and possibly south-eastern Paraguay.

Description 
The wingspan is 99–119 mm for males and 103–130 mm for females. It is similar to Eumorpha anchemolus, but the forewing upperside pattern is more contrasting and variegated. There is a prominent discal spot found on the greenish buff basal area of the hindwing upperside.

Biology 
Adults are on wing year round.

The larvae feed on Saurauia montana and Cissus rhombifolia, as well as Actinidiaceae species. They have a well-developed anal horn in the first instar, becoming less prominent as the larvae develop.

References

Eumorpha
Moths described in 1903
Sphingidae of South America
Moths of South America